Gulam Rabbani Khan (Urdu:غلام ربانی خان, Hindi: गुलाम रब्बानी खान; (1918–1991) son of Gulam Mustafa Khan) was an Indian freedom fighter, and a soldier in the British Indian Army. He joined the army in 1939. After two years he switched to the Indian National Army (Azad Hind Fauj) established by Subhas Chandra Bose to fight for Indian independence.

Early life

Gulam Rabbani Khan was born in Malvipura in the Indian state of Maharashtra. He Joined the British Indian Army in 1939 and was sent abroad. In 1941 he was arrested by the Japanese during World War II.

Freedom fighter 
He participated in the Freedom Movements of his father Gulam Mustafa Khan and Grandfather Gulam Ahmed Khan. 

Captain General Mohan Singh and Captain Akram inspired Rabbani to join the Azad Hind Fauj. British officers asked him why he was leaving the British Army. He told the British Commander that he had to free his country from British rule. He joined the Azad Hind Fauj Pathan Regiment.

On 15 August 1972, the Silver Jubilee of India's independence was celebrated, and Rabbani was given a Certificate of Honor and a Medal. 

He died on 5 December 1991.

References

1918 births
1991 deaths
People from Buldhana district
Indian National Army